The Pioneer Yosemite History Center is an assembled collection of historic buildings from Yosemite National Park that is located in Wawona, California. Visitors can walk around the buildings year round, and the interiors are open in the summer on a limited basis.  There are also special programs and carriage rides in the summer.

The buildings include:

 Acting Superintendent's Headquarters
 Blacksmith shop
 Cavalry office
 Chris Jorgenson Studio
 Degnan's Bakery
 George Anderson Pioneer Home
 Hodgdon Homestead Cabin
 Powderhouse and jail
 Ranger patrol cabin
 Wawona Covered Bridge
 Yosemite Transportation Company Office (aka Wells Fargo Office)

The Acting Superintendent's Headquarters, the Chris Jorgenson Studio, the Hodgdon Homestead Cabin, the Wawona Covered Bridge, and the Yosemite Transportation Company Office are all listed on the National Register of Historic Places.

References

External links
 Yosemite National Park: Museums, Historic Buildings, and Cemeteries

Museums in Mariposa County, California
Buildings and structures in Yosemite National Park
Open-air museums in California